Colin Powell (1937–2021) was the U.S. Secretary of State and Chairman of the Joint Chiefs of Staff of the U.S. military.

Colin Powell may also refer to:

People
 Colin Powell (economist) (1937–2019), British economist, and influential Jersey financier
 Colin Powell (footballer) (born 1948), British soccer player

Education
 Colin Powell School for Civic and Global Leadership, CCNY, West Harlem, NYC, NYS, USA
 Colin Powell Leadership Academy (K-12), Dayton, Ohio, USA
 Colin Powell Center for Leadership & Ethics, Hargrave Military Academy, Chatham, Virginia, USA
 Colin Powell Middle School (Matteson), Elementary School District 159, Illinois, USA
 Colin Powell School (K-8), Long Beach Unified School District, North Long Beach, Long Beach, California, USA

See also

 
 Colin (disambiguation)
 Powell (disambiguation)
 General Powell (disambiguation)